Wilbert Ethelbert Greaves (born 23 December 1956) is a male Barbadian born retired hurdler who represented Great Britain and England.

Athletics career
Greaves competed in the 110 metres hurdles at the 1980 Summer Olympics and the 1984 Summer Olympics. He represented England in the 110 metres hurdles and 400 metres hurdles events, at the 1982 Commonwealth Games in Brisbane, Queensland, Australia. Four years later he represented England in the 110 metres hurdles event, at the 1986 Commonwealth Games in Edinburgh, Scotland.

References

1956 births
Living people
Athletes (track and field) at the 1980 Summer Olympics
Athletes (track and field) at the 1984 Summer Olympics
British male hurdlers
Olympic athletes of Great Britain
Athletes (track and field) at the 1982 Commonwealth Games
Athletes (track and field) at the 1986 Commonwealth Games
Commonwealth Games competitors for England